Bodaybo is a town in Irkutsk Oblast, Russia.

Bodaybo may also refer to:
Bodaybo (river), a river in Irkutsk Oblast, Russia, on which the town of Bodaybo stands
Bodaybo District
Bodaybo Airport , a regional airport in Irkutsk Oblast, Russia